The 2024 Queensland state election is scheduled to be held on 26 October 2024 to elect all members to the Legislative Assembly of Queensland pursuant to the Constitution (Fixed Term Parliament) Amendment Act 2015. As a result of the 2016 Queensland term length referendum, the term of the parliament will run for four years.

Electoral system 
Queensland has compulsory voting and uses full-preference instant-runoff voting for single-member electorates. The election will be conducted by the Electoral Commission of Queensland (ECQ). The party or coalition that wins the majority of seats (at least 47) will form the government. If no majority emerges then the party or coalition that is able to command the confidence of the Legislative Assembly will form government.

The party or coalition that wins the second highest number of seats forms the opposition, with the remaining parties and independents candidates being allocated to the cross bench.

The Queensland Parliament is the only unicameral state parliament in Australia, composed of the Legislative Assembly. The upper house, the Queensland Legislative Council was abolished in 1922.

Key dates
The election will be for all 93 members of the Legislative Assembly. Pursuant to Constitution (Fixed Term Parliament) Amendment Act 2015 Queensland has fixed terms, with all elections following the 2020 election held every four years on the last Saturday of October. The Governor may call an election earlier than scheduled if the Government does not maintain confidence, or the annual appropriation bill fails to pass.

Electoral pendulum

 Notes

Opinion polling

Graphical summary

Primary voting graph

Two-party preferred graph

Preferred Premier

Palaszczuk approval ratings

Crisafulli approval ratings

Voting intention

Preferred Premier and leadership polling table

References

Elections in Queensland
October 2024 events in Australia
Queensland
2020s in Queensland